HMCS Gulnare was a Canadian government ship that served as a patrol boat and guard vessel for the Royal Canadian Navy (RCN) during the First World War. Acquired by the Canadian government in 1902, Gulnare was used for fisheries patrol and hydrographic survey duties until 1914. Following the war, Gulnare was used to intercept smugglers. Returned to government service in 1920, the vessel was converted to a lightship in 1925 and sold in 1937 to private interests. The vessel was broken up for scrap in the late 1940s.

Description

Powered by a triple-expansion steam engine, Gulnare was propelled by one screw creating 
 (nominal). The ship carried  of coal for fuel. Gulnare had a complement of 25.

Service history

Origins and early years

Gulnare was a steel trawler-type vessel constructed by Charles Connell and Company at their yard in Scotsoun, Scotland. The ship was launched on 23 March 1893 and completed in April 1893. The ship was originally used by the British Admiralty for survey work in Newfoundland waters. Acquired by Canada in 1902 Gulnare was refitted and used for tidal and current survey work on the East Coast and the lower Saint Lawrence River. As one of the ships in the Canadian Hydrographic Survey, she was transferred from the Department of Marine and Fisheries to the Department of Naval Service when the latter was created in 1910. In 1912 she was transferred from survey work to duties as a tender and relief lightship in the lower Saint Lawrence River.

First World War

Gulnare was placed under naval control in 1914. The RCN initially planned the use the vessel as an auxiliary minesweeper. In 1916 Gulnare was assigned to patrol the coast of Labrador from Belle Isle to Natashkwan. The ship was serving as a guard vessel for Bedford Basin in Halifax, Nova Scotia at the time of the Halifax Explosion on 6 December 1917, but suffered minimal damage. Following the end of the war in 1918, Gulnare was kept in reserve by the RCN.

Postwar

Gulnare was used for contraband patrols in 1918 and 1919 before being returned to the Department of Marine and Fisheries in 1920 following the postwar reorganization of the government. In 1925 Gulnare was converted to a lightship for use by the Quebec Marine Agency and also found use as a tender by the agency until 1931. In 1934 Gulnare returned to tidal survey work and continued until taken out of service in 1936. Following completion of the tidal survey, the vessel was deemed unsuitable for further work by the agency and in September 1937 Gulnare was sold to Manseau Shipyards of Sorel, Quebec. The following year, the vessel was acquired by Marine Industries of Montreal. Sources disagree on when the vessel was scrapped; Maginley and Collin claim the vessel was broken up in 1946 while the Miramar Ship Index claims the vessel was broken up in 1949.

Citations

Sources

External links
 Converted civilian vessels

Auxiliary ships of the Royal Canadian Navy
Patrol vessels of the Royal Canadian Navy
1893 ships
Ships built in Scotland
World War I naval ships of Canada
World War I ships of Canada
Canadian Government Ship